In the performing arts industry such as theatre, film, or television, casting, or a casting call, is a pre-production process for selecting a certain type of actor, dancer, singer, or extra for a particular role or part in a script, screenplay, or teleplay. This process may be used for a motion picture, television program, documentary film, music video, play, or advertisement, intended for an audience.

Cast types or roles

Actors are selected to play various types of roles. Main cast, also called starring roles, consist of several actors whose appearances are significant in film, theatre, or television. There is often a leading actor (or sometimes leading actress for a woman) who plays the largest role, that of the protagonist in a production. When there is not a single leading actor, the main roles are called ensemble cast, which comprises multiple principal actors and performers who are typically assigned roughly equal amounts of screen time. A supporting actor is an actor who performs a role in a play or film below that of the leading actor(s). Supporting roles are above that of a bit part, which is direct interaction with the principal actors and no more than five lines of dialogue, often referred to as a "five-or-less" or "under-five" in the United States, or "under-sixes" in British television. When a well-known actor or other celebrity appears in a bit part, it is called cameo appearance.

Casting process
The casting process involves a series of auditions before a casting panel, composed of individuals within a theatrical production such as theatrical producer, and theater director. However, within a given television production a casting panel can consist of a television producer, or within film production a casting panel could contain a film producer, film director, and/or choreographer. Usually, in nearly all areas of show business, a casting director is on this panel as well. In the early stages of this process performers often may present, or are presented with prepared audition pieces such as monologues, songs, choreography, scripts and or sides.

These audition pieces are usually videotaped, typically in the form of screen tests and then attached with resumes, as well as head shots and or viewed online via websites such as IMDb, then shared with film producers, film directors and or studio executives. Later stages may involve groups of actors both union, (SAG-AFTRA) and non-union depending on the size and scope of the production, attempting to read material from the work under consideration, paired off in various combinations of two, three or more. With each of the actor's overall motivational choices evaluated, the casting panel considers both the individual actor, and the "chemistry" created from either one of the combinations set forth within the read-through. 

Casting calls may go out into the general public at large, sometimes referred to as a "cattle call" (a U.S. term), or open audition, in which hundreds or even thousands of performers compete for a number of roles.  

Casting character breakdowns, not to be confused with script breakdowns, are often provided by production agents who submit their clients to casting, which provides a brief summary of character (age, gender, race or ethnicity, situations they may be involved in). 

These agents and managers are positioned all over the world, and subscribe to this service that literally has an entire suite of services for just about every aspect of the breakdown, for a monthly service subscription fee.

An actor may go through several casting calls before receiving a part, and even though well-known actors or actresses often still go through this very necessary process, some are privileged enough to have well-known writers, screenwriters, directors and/or producers pitch a project for their intent to be cast in a role. The well-known actor or actress often negotiates producer credit as well as very lucrative monetary compensation.

Casting director / casting agencies
For some major productions, the process of selecting actors for sometimes hundreds of speaking parts and roles often requires specialized staff. While the last word remains with the people in charge such as the director, producer, artistic departments and overall production team, a casting director or "CD" is in charge of most of the daily work involved in this process during pre-production. A casting director is sometimes assisted by a casting associate; productions with large numbers of extras may have their own extras casting director as well. However in all aspects of a film or television production's budget, they are all a part of the above-the-line, answering to the director as part of his or her staff.

Most films use either a casting agency or a casting director to find actors to match the roles in the film, apart from the lead actors, who are often chosen by directors and producers. The job of a casting director is to know a lot about a lot of actors, so that they can advise and present to the director the best of the available talent. Casting directors are highly influential and are usually on the project because the director trusts their judgement; they are also the ones who decide who the director does see.

Casting agencies are independent organisations which liaise between performers and directors or producers. They need to have detailed knowledge of actors on their books, as they are responsible for putting forward suitable candidates to match specific roles described by producers and directors. The agency draws up lists, and interviews are conducted, after which selected candidates attend an audition. If the producer selects one or more actors, the casting agency negotiates contracts and fees. Casting agents have to get to know many performers and assess their level of skill, and use a selection process to cut a large number down to a small group to bring to the producer for consideration. They may also represent actors, but not necessarily.

The role of the casting director or casting agency may include the following:
 Maintain a list of actors (including availability details, headshots, videos) and get to know them
 Meet the film's director and, if possible, the writers
 Understand the story and characters, which involved reading the script
 Keep within the production budget
 Run auditions
 Recommend actors
 Negotiate contracts between (often done by the actor's agent)
 Assist the actors with understanding the characters 

The casting director remains as a liaison between director, actors and their agents/managers and the studio/network to get the characters in the script cast. Some casting directors build an impressive career working on numerous Hollywood productions, such as Marion Dougherty, Mary Jo Slater, Mary Selway, Lynn Stalmaster, April Webster, Robert J. Ulrich, Tammara Billik, Marci Liroff, Avy Kaufman, Mindy Marin, and Robi Reed. 

At least in the early stages of casting and or extras casting, the process may be decentralized geographically, often in conjunction with actual shooting planned in different locations. Another reason may be tapping into each home market in the case of an international co-production. However, for the top parts, the choice of one or more beautiful people, whose presence is of enormous commercial importance, may rather follow strictly personal channels, e.g. direct contact with the director. During this time known as the "attachment phase" of a film, the casting director's job is to send out copies of the current script to agents for what is known as coverage. Coverage is when a script yet to be cast is read, summarized into a one-pager, and a brief set of character descriptions established. At this time, if an agency agrees to give coverage to a film, they will submit a list of ideas to the casting directors of actors available, capable, and in the price range of the film. Also, casting directors create their own idea lists and can "check avails" or call the actor representation to see if they are available and interested in taking on potential projects. If an idea that is generated from a casting director and a subsequent avail check or from an agent's recommendation is "approved" by the director, producers, and financiers (or studio), the casting director sends out what is called an "offer". The offer, usually contains a letter to the actor's representative explaining the role in question, a copy of the script, why the actor has been selected, the length of time commitment, the approximate start date of filming, the filming location, and the proposed salary offering. If the actor does not respond to the material or for whatever reason cannot accept the job, they respond to casting with what is called a "pass." If they accept the offer, the agent engages the casting director and a deal memo is sent from casting to the representative. It is at this time when negotiations between agency and production happen to finalize any deal points before the entertainment lawyers step in and draw up the attachment contracts. If this process happens very early on in the development of a movie but the official shoot dates and details are not yet known, a Letter of Intent or "LOI" is drafted, to indicate, if and when the project is "green lit" or begins active production, the actor is already hired to portray that particular role. 

After the attachment phase is complete (which depends on many factors, including financial backers, studio heads, availability of other above-the-line personnel), the physical auditions begin for all of the remaining roles. During this time, depending on the budget of the film, they could have what is called "pre-screens" where the actor auditions only for a casting director (or associate) to see if they are right for the material. After pre-screens would be a "director session". During this time the actor comes in and auditions (usually with the same material) and performs for the casting director and the film director. If there is a next step, it is usually a "callback" or producer session, where anyone who has decision-making power is in the room for your audition. In television, this phase is referred to as a "screen test" and network executives would also be in attendance. Once actors are selected from the pool of available actors, the same booking process that happens in the attachment phase takes place for any actor except extras.

The resulting list of actors who were selected to play a character for a production, is called a cast list, which is incorporated into a production company's daily call sheet, and reflected in the projects title sequence especially with film and television.

Casting director workshops
A common practice of many casting directors and casting associates in the United States have been casting director workshops. The types of workshop practices vary, but typically aspiring actors pay to perform in front of a casting professional who gives back feedback on the performance. Actors and industry professionals against workshops argue that casting directors are paid to find talent, not have talent pay to be seen by them. Supporters of the workshops argue that the workshops have classroom like settings and are a good source of feedback and networking.

Because of their mixed reception, casting director workshops have not been met without controversy. Former Criminal Minds casting director Scott David was fired after The Hollywood Reporter published a story about his casting director workshops. In February 2017, five casting director workshops were charged with criminal charges for charging actors to audition for projects. In January 2018, Lindsay Chag, the casting director of films like Robin Hood: Men in Tights and Dracula: Dead and Loving It, was convicted guilty of violating the Talent Scam Prevention Act for her role in casting director workshops.

Casting office personnel 
Readers: This person reads all other character's lines opposite the actor who is currently auditioning. A good reader is someone who has acting skills, but who has no interest in booking a role through that casting director's office at that time. A reader will know how to give and take and play with other actors without ever outshining the auditioning actors.

Interns: Interns are more common to commercial casting offices which host as many as a dozen different casting directors holding different auditions per day. While some commercial casting offices hold permanent casting space, many rent out studios on a project to project basis. A key intern will work with many busy casting directors sorting mail, copying sides and transcribing them onto "cue cards" or large boards to be read off of as prompts in the casting room, help actors sign in, and keep the flow of actors going in and out of the casting room as smooth as possible.

Casting Assistants: This is the entry-level position in the field of casting. These people go above and beyond the call of duty of your typical office assistant. They do everything from covering phones, to making copies, setting up audition (aka "session") equipment like lights, the camera, sound equipment, etc. They sometimes can be found in the office relaying audition appointments, checking actors avails, or in the casting room making sure the recording software is running smoothly so the Casting Director can focus on each actor's performance.

Casting Associates: Associates is the second chain of command in a casting office. Once a casting associate has worked for two years in the field of casting, they can apply for membership in Casting Society of America. Typically, the work under a Casting Director running pre-read sessions, prepping deal memos, and doing any calls to agents. Many associates begin to take on smaller scale projects so they can amass enough credits to move up in rank in CSA to a full-fledged Casting Director.

Race and gender in casting 
In the United States casting is deciphered by what roles are needed. Productions don’t always have a certain race or gender in mind for their starring role. It’s been noticeable that white people are cast the most in movies. Also that men are cast as leads more than women are.

Recognition for casting

Canada 
The national Canadian Screen Awards has presented an annual award for Best Casting in a Television Series since 2006. A new award for Best Casting in a Film is slated to be introduced in 2021.

The Prix Iris, the regional Canadian film awards for Quebec, introduced the Prix Iris for Best Casting in 2017.

United Kingdom 
In 2020, the British Academy Film Awards introduced the BAFTA Award for Best Casting.

United States 
The highest honor a casting director can receive in the United States is the Artios Award, awarded by their peers in the Casting Society of America. Artios comes from the Greek word meaning "perfectly fitted." The Artios award excellence in casting for all genres of casting except commercials. The Artios are currently held mid-January annually with ceremonies in New York, Los Angeles, and (beginning in 2018) London. Since their incarnation in 1985, they were held in November but were moved in the 2013–2014 season to align with the rest of the film and television industry's awards season. The Artios is awarded to those CSA members who receive primary screen (or program) credit for casting on the winning project. Location casting directors, casting executives and department heads who are CSA members and who receive credit on winning projects also receive an Artios Award. CSA Associates on those projects are recognized in the press and with a certificate.

The Emmy Awards has a category for casting directors. As of 2017, Junie Lowry-Johnson has won the most casting Emmys as an individual, all in the drama category. She has six awards for her work on NYPD Blue, Six Feet Under, True Blood and Homeland. The only shows to win casting Emmys three times were 30 Rock and Veep, both in the comedy category. In 2017, at the 69th Primetime Emmy Awards, the Academy of Television Arts & Sciences introduced the Primetime Emmy Award for Outstanding Casting for a Reality Program.

National organizations

Casting Society of America (CSA)
The significant organization of professional screen, television, reality, and theater casting in the US is the Casting Society of America (CSA), but membership is optional.  Casting directors organized in 2005 and became members of a collective bargaining unit, the Hollywood Teamsters Local 399 and New York Teamsters Local 817.

See also
 Audition website
 Backstage (a casting publication)
 Casting By
 Casting couch
 Character actor
 Dramatis personae
 Ensemble cast
 Extra (actor)
 Fach, the German opera casting system
 Stock character
 Stunt casting
 Stunt coordinator

References

External links
 The Casting Society of America 
 The Casting Directors' Guild (UK & Ireland)

 
Performing arts
Theatre